UBC Botanical Garden, at the University of British Columbia, was established in 1916 under the directorship of John Davidson, British Columbia's first provincial botanist. It is the oldest botanical garden at a university in Canada.

The garden measures approximately 44 hectares (440,000 m2 / 110 acres) and includes over 8000 different kinds of plants. Visitors to the garden should expect to spend a minimum of one hour exploring the garden. Gardens include an Asian garden, an alpine garden, a native plants garden, a food garden and a physic (medicinal) garden.

In 2002, the UBC Centre for Plant Research became the research arm of the UBC Botanical Garden. The Centre for Plant Research examines topics such as plant adaptation, genomics and phytochemistry. The Botanical Garden and the Centre for Plant Research are both encompassed by UBC's Faculty of Science.

UBC Botanical Garden also administers the Nitobe Memorial Garden, a traditional Japanese garden located on campus.

External links
 UBC Botanical Garden and Centre for Plant Research homepage
 website of the garden's journal, Davidsonia

Botanical gardens in Canada
Gardens in Canada
Botanical Garden and Centre for Plant Research
Botanical research institutes
Research institutes in Canada
Parks in British Columbia